The Social Democratic Co-ordination of Cuba (Coordinadora Social Demócrata de Cuba) is an illegal political party in Cuba, with a social democratic ideology.

See also
List of political parties in Cuba

Banned socialist parties
Political parties in Cuba
Social democratic parties